Game or gameness is a quality of fighting dogs and working terriers that are selectively bred and conditioned from a very early age to develop traits of eagerness despite the threat of substantive injury. Dogs displaying this trait can also be described as persevering, ready and willing, full of fight, spirited, or plucky.

Dog fighting breeds

In dog fighting breeds gameness is valued as it gives the dog the ability to maintain the attack in baiting, despite ripped flesh, dehydration, exhaustion or broken bones. As one writer describes it, "Game is the dog that won't quit fighting, the dog that'll die in the ring, the dog that'll fight with two broken legs."  The scope and method of training to develop a game dog varies dramatically depending on the level and experience of the dog-fighter. Most "gamebred" dogs have a high pain threshold.

Working terrier breeds
Pertaining to working terriers and other small hunting dogs, earthdog trials are used to determine the dog's gameness in hunting dangerous pest species underground.  The American Working Terrier Association currently offers a Certificate of Gameness (CG) title as a basic instinct test (meaning that it is done without conditioning/training the dog, to see if the dog naturally exhibits gameness) for working terriers and dachshunds. In the past, the Irish Kennel Club required the now-discarded Teastas Mor certification for champion animals (intended for breeding) which involved "showing gameness in attacking badgers. Five minutes is the minimum period a terrier shall be in contact with the badger, except when the terrier draws the badger in less time." "Drawing" means pulling the badger out of the hole. The purpose of the Teastas Mor was to determine the dog's capabilities for work and fitness for breeding, not primarily for entertainment as in the blood-sports of baiting.

See also

Dog aggression
Dog behaviourist
Instinct
Prey drive

References

Dog training and behavior
Baiting (blood sport)
Cruelty to animals